Dangerous Partners is a 1945 American adventure film directed by Edward L. Cahn and written by Marion Parsonnet and Edmund L. Hartmann, based on the novel “Paper Chase” by Oliver Weld Bayer, the pen-name of Leo and Eleanor Bayer (later known as the screen-writer Eleanor Perry.) The film stars James Craig, Signe Hasso, Edmund Gwenn, Audrey Totter, Mabel Paige, John Warburton, Henry O'Neill and Grant Withers. The film was released on June 7, 1945, by Metro-Goldwyn-Mayer.

Plot
Carola and Clyde Ballister find a briefcase containing four wills leaving $1-million bequests to an Albert Kingby. They visit the Cleveland home of the first person who wrote a will benefiting Kingsby, a man named Kempen. They meet his attorney, Jeff Caign, and learn Kempen intended to leave the money to a singer, Lili Roegan.

Kempen dies mysteriously, so the Ballisters take a train to go see Professor Ludlow, the next beneficiary. Caign tails them, discovers a dead Clyde, in Kingsby’s compartment and becomes the crooked Carola's new partner.

The real Kingby turns up. He apparently is part of a Nazi group assisting war criminals. Carola and Caign, now lovers, go to New York City, where they are taken captive by Kingsby and pressured to reveal where the missing wills are. The police close in, kill Kingby but don't charge Carola and Caign, who are free to get on with their sordid lives.

Cast 
James Craig as Jeff Caign
Signe Hasso as Carola Ballister
Edmund Gwenn as Albert Richard Kingby
Audrey Totter as Lili Roegan
Mabel Paige as Marie Drumman
John Warburton as Clyde Ballister
Henry O'Neill as Police Lt. Duffy
Grant Withers as Jonathan Drumman
Felix Bressart as Prof. Roland Ludlow
Warner Anderson as Miles Kempen
Stephen McNally as Co-pilot 
John Eldredge as Farrel

Harriet Lee was the voice double for Audrey Totter in her singing scene.

References

External links 
 

1945 films
1940s English-language films
American adventure films
1945 adventure films
Metro-Goldwyn-Mayer films
Films directed by Edward L. Cahn
American black-and-white films
1940s American films